Paul Coppens is a Belgian television writer and sound engineer.

Mainly a writer for Belgian television, Coppens is probably best known for his writing of  Alle maten since 1998 with Frans Ceusters.

External links

References

Flemish television writers
Male television writers
Year of birth missing (living people)
Living people
Place of birth missing (living people)
Belgian male writers